The 505th Bombardment Group is an inactive United States Air Force unit.  Its last assignment was with Thirteenth Air Force, stationed at Clark Field, Philippines.  It was inactivated on 30 June 1946.

The unit served primarily in the Pacific Ocean theater of World War II as part of Twentieth Air Force. The 505th Bomb Group's aircraft engaged in B-29 Superfortress bombardment operations against Japan.  Its aircraft were identified by a "K" (January to March 1945) or "W" (April to September 1945)  inside a Circle painted on the tail.

History
The unit was established in early 1944 at Dalhart Army Air Field, Texas, being formed as a B-29 Superfortress Very Heavy bombardment Group.   Thu unit was formed with four bomb squadrons, being a mixture of both new and reassigned units.  The 482d, 484th and 485th having World War I origins and the 483d being a newly constituted unit.

Due to a shortage of B-29s, the group was equipped with former II Bomber Command Boeing B-17 Flying Fortresses previously used for training heavy bomber replacement personnel.  The group was eventually equipped with newly manufactured B-29 Superfortresses at Harvard Army Airfield, Nebraska during the summer of 1944.   In May shortages in aircraft and equipment led to the 485th Bomb Squadron being inactivated, with its personnel being consolidated into other group squadrons and the 505th becoming a three squadron group (the 485th would be reactivated a month later as part of the 501st Bombardment Group).

The 505th was deployed to the Central Pacific Area in late 1944, being assigned to the XXI Bomber Command 313th Bombardment Wing in the Northern Mariana Islands; being stationed at North Field, Tinian. It entered combat in February 1945 with strikes on Iwo Jima and the Truk Islands. It then began bombing the Japanese Home Islands at very long ranges, attacking military, industrial and transportation targets. Switched to night incendiary raids attacking major Japanese cities in the spring of 1945, causing massive destruction of urbanized areas.

The 505th Bomb Group received a Distinguished Unit Citation for a strike against the Nakajima aircraft factory at Ota in February 1945. Conducted incendiary raids on area targets in Japan, carrying out these missions at night and at low altitude. Bombed in support of the Allied assault on Okinawa in April 1945. Engaged in mining operations against Japanese shipping, receiving second DUC for mining the Shimonoseki Strait and harbors of the Inland sea, June–July 1945.  The group continued strategic bombing raids and incendiary attacks until the Japanese Capitulation in August 1945.

After V-J Day, the 505th dropped supplies to Allied prisoners, participated in show-of-force missions, and flew over Japan to evaluate bombardment damage.  In the fall of 1945, the group largely demobilized as part of the "Sunset Project", with some aircraft being sent reclamation on Tinian; others being returned to the United States for storage at aircraft depots in the southwest.  By Christmas, the group fleet was reduced to 30 or less planes Many of the remaining veterans signed for "any conditions of travel" to get home, arriving three weeks later in Oakland, California, where troop trains scattered them for points of discharge close to their homes.

The unit was largely a paper organization when it was reassigned to Clark Field in the Philippines in March 1946, and assigned to Thirteenth Air Force.   At Clark its remaining aircraft and personnel were consolidated into other units, and it was inactivated in June.

Lineage
 Constituted as 505th Bombardment Group (Very Heavy) on 28 February 1944.
 Activated on 11 March 1944
 Inactivated on 30 June 1946

Assignments
 Second Air Force, 28 February – 6 November 1944
 Attached to 17th Bombardment Operational Training Wing (Very Heavy), 1 April-6 November 1944
 313th Bombardment Wing, 19 December 1944
 Thirteenth Air Force, 6 December 1945 – 30 June 1946

Components
 482d Bombardment Squadron: 1944–1946
 483d Bombardment Squadron: 1944–1946
 484th Bombardment Squadron: 1944–1946
 485th Bombardment Squadron: 1944

Stations
 Dalhart AAF, Texas, 11 March 1944
 Harvard AAF, Nebraska, 1 April – 6 November 1944
 North Field, Tinian, Mariana Islands, 19 December 1944 – 5 March 1946
 Clark Field, Luzon, Philippines, 14 March – 30 June 1946

Aircraft
 B-17 Flying Fortress, 1944 (Training only)
 B-29 Superfortress, 1944–1946

References

 Maurer, Maurer (1983). Air Force Combat Units of World War II. Maxwell AFB, Alabama: Office of Air Force History. .

External links
 Expanded history of the 505th Bombardment Group

Bombardment groups of the United States Army Air Forces in the Japan campaign
Military units and formations established in 1944
1944 in Japan
1945 in Japan